Azabon is a central nervous system stimulant of the sulfonamide class that is also used as a nootropic. As it is a sulpha drug, care must be taken during administration, and certain individuals must avoid azabon altogether to prevent an allergic reaction. Despite being a sulfonamide, azabon has poor antibacterial potency, although this decreased activity is common among other benzenesulfonamides with two substituents on N1. Azabon is synthesized from 3-azabicyclo-[2.2.2]nonane, which is itself prepared by pyrolysis of aliphatic diamine.

See also 
Dimethocaine

References 

Stimulants
Nootropics
Sulfonamides